Ring 0 or zero ring or variation, may refer to:

 Zero ring, the trivial ring in mathematics ring theory
 Ring 0: Birthday, a Japanese horror film prequel in the Ringu J-horror film series
 The Ring Volume 0: Birthday, a Japanese manga based on the film and short story
 Ring 0 (computer security), the highest privilege level
 O̊, the letter "O" with a ring diacritical mark
 to call (ring) phone number 0 (zero), calling the switchboard operator

See also

 Birthday (short story collection), a Japanese anthology containing prequels and sequels to Ring
 Ring road (disambiguation)
 Ring (disambiguation)